Koetter is a surname. Notable people with the surname include: 

Dirk Koetter (born 1959), American football coach
Jim Koetter (born  1938), American football coach

See also
Ketter

Surnames of German origin